Straw marquetry is a craft very similar to that of wood marquetry, except that straw replaces the wood veneer. It is thought to have first been practised in the East; examples were brought to England in the 17th century.

To mimic the varying shades of wood veneer, wheat or oat straw has to be split, then soaked in cold, warm, or hot water. The strips are then ironed, and there will be a variety of tones from pale gold to deepest dark brown.

There are accounts of nuns in France and Switzerland making a variety of items using straw marquetry.

The most famous straw marquetry was practised by prisoners of war from the Napoleonic wars. Dartmoor and other prisons had been built for them; the prison most famous for straw marquetry was Norman Cross, Huntingdon.

Easter eggs are decorated with straw applique, especially in Eastern European countries. Geometric shapes, stars and flower motifs are the most common themes. There is a slight difference in the way the straw is prepared, however; for marquetry, the straws are soaked, split and ironed; for egg decoration the straw is not ironed.

See also
Corn dolly, Straw, Oat, Wheat, Barley, Rye, Easter egg

Photo gallery

References

Visual arts genres
Straw art